A trajectory is the path a moving object follows through space.

Types of trajectories include:
 trajectory of a projectile
lofted trajectory, a particular type of non-minimum energy ballistic trajectory
 trajectory (fluid mechanics), the motion of a point in a moving fluid
 in motion planning, the trajectory of a robotic motion
 phase space trajectories of dynamical systems

Trajectory may also refer to:
 Trajectory (DC Comics), a DC Comics character
 Trajectory (The Flash episode), an episode of the U.S. TV series The Flash that includes the character
 Trajectory (Arrowverse), a fictional character appearing in the Arrowverse television franchise
 trajectory hermeneutics, a liberal teaching of Christian Postmodernism
 Trajectory Inc., an American ebook platform
 trajectory optimization, the process of minimizing or maximizing performance
 Trajectories (magazine), a 1980s tabloid magazine
 in finance, the end point from source spending (where the money goes)
 in cricket, trajectory is known as flight or loop
 in writing, trajectory is an informative discussion (or map) of the various avenues texts can travel as they both affect, and are affected by, the world.